Electricidad is a 2009 album by Mexican duo Jesse & Joy.

Electricidad (English: Electricity) may also refer to:

"Electricidad", a song by Los Abandoned from their EP Demotape
"Electricidad", a song by Jesse & Joy from their album Electricidad, mentioned above
"Electricidad", a song by Lucero, from her album Sólo Pienso En Ti
"Electricidad", a song by Pérez Prado
Electricidad, a Chicano adaptation by Luis Alfaro of Greek tragedy The Libation Bearers
Mr. Electricidad, a character in The Adventures of Sharkboy and Lavagirl in 3-D

See also
Electricidad de Caracas